Events from the year 2019 in Antarctica.

Events

June 
Gaping holes found winter ice packs, which previously had been without explanation is found to most likely be caused by storms and salt with new research.

July 
Scientists from the University College London and the British Antarctic Survey discover that a snow covered volcano on Mount Michael on Saunders Island in the South Sandwich Islands contains a lake of lava within its crater. It is only the eighth lake of molten rock found on Earth so far.

Climate
A 100 mile long (250 kilometers) iceberg called A-68, which broke off of the Larsen C Ice Shelf on July 12, 2017, has drifted 155 miles (250 kilometers) from the ice shelf during the first two years of it breaking off.

References

 
2010s in Antarctica
Years of the 21st century in Antarctica